Yedikule is a neighborhood of Fatih, Istanbul in Turkey. It is named after the seven-towered Yedikule Fortress, which surrounds the neighborhood. Urbanized in the 16th century, the neighborhood became a hub for industrial and agricultural activities. Yedikule has a local football team  that played in the TFF Second League for a season.

Marmaray passes through the neighbourhood, however Yedikule railway station is closed and the trains do not serve  the neighbourhood.

History 
Urbanization of Yedikule started in 16th century, and became a major hub for industrial and agricultural activities. Yedikule Walls (also known as Theodosius Walls) are also an notable historical artifact. Its tower, Yedikule Fortress, constructed between 408-450 AD, and repaired after 740 Istanbul earthquake.

Ottoman period 
Yedikule was known with its gardens, Yedikule Urban Gardens, which was also famous with its cabbages and lettuces and used more than 1500 years. According to the guarantor books of year 1735, there were 344 gardens (including nine gardens which is established between "Surdibi" area, which stretch between Yedikule Gate and Silivri Gate); according to a map from 1835, there were 102 gardens.

Yedikule (with Edirnekapı) was also became host for some establishments like slaughterhouses, soap and candle makers, and workshops.

Modern times 
Yedikule became highly populated after the population boom in Istanbul between 1940s-1980s; and as a result of that, the Urban Gardens and industrial areas became residential areas and some parts of Urban Gardens used for build Otoyol 1 and create waste-filling areas in 1970s. The municipality of İstanbul started a rehabilitation project for remaining parts of Urban Gardens. Ekrem İmamoğlu, as the Mayor of Istanbul, stated that: "I'm ashamed from that the walls (Yedikule Walls) hasn't been toured since years."

Soil and seismology 
A major seismically active fault zone, the North Anatolian Fault, passes offshore from Yedikule in the Sea of Marmara.

Demographics 
Yedikule was including a notable non-Muslim population and schools until the recent times. There is also Greek and Armenian churches and an Armenian hospital, Yedikule Surp Pıgiç Hospital. Its population is 18,879 according to 2019 census.

In popular culture 
Kazım Koyuncu gave a concert in Yedikule Fortress in 2004. Yedikule also hosted thematic festivals such as Lettuce Feast in the past.

Gallery

References 

Neighbourhoods of Fatih